The DFB-Pokal 2010–11 was the 31st season of the cup competition, Germany's second-most important title in women's football. 1. FFC Frankfurt defeated 1. FFC Turbine Potsdam 2–1 in the final in Cologne on 26 March 2011.

Participating clubs
The following teams were qualified for the DFB-Pokal:

1st round 

The drawing for the first round was on 2 July 2010. The seven best clubs of the previous Bundesliga season, Turbine Potsdam, FCR Duisburg, FFC Frankfurt, Bayern Munich, VfL Wolfsburg, Bad Neuenahr, and Hamburger SV, were awarded byes for the first round.

2nd round 
The draw for the second round was held on 16 August 2010. The matches were played on 1 September 2010.

Round of 16 
The draw for the round of 16 was held on 11 September 2010. The matches were played on 23 and 24 October 2010.

Quarter-finals 
The draw was held on 28 October 2010. The matches were planned to be played on 12 December 2010, but have been postponed several times due to bad weather.

Semi-finals 
The draw for the semi-finals was held on 3 February 2011. The matches were played on 27 February 2011.

Final

References

DFB-Pokal Frauen seasons
Pokal
Fra